Vinzenz Fux (Vincenzio Fuxio), (c.1606–1659) was an Austrian musician and composer.

Fux was born in Weißkirchen, Styria, and was employed as the organist of the church Maria am Gestade in Vienna before he joined the chapel of Eleonora Gonzaga, widow of Holy Roman Emperor Ferdinand II. Fux mainly composed Masses and trio sonatas, which have survived in manuscripts. It is testimony of their high quality that they were even taken at times for works of the later imperial chapelmaster Johann Joseph Fux, who was however not related to Vinzenz Fux. The Kroměříž music archive is the major source of musical compositions by Vinzenz Fux.

Vinzenz Fux died in Vienna, in his early fifties.

Selected compositions by Fux
Justorum animæ: 2 Chori, 2 Violini, 3 Viole, Basso continuo
Litaniæ Beatæ Mariæ Virginis: S solo, SATB in cappella, Violino, 3 Violæ, Basso continuo
Missa S. Xaverii: 8 voci in concerto, 2 Trombettæ ad libitum, 2 Cornetti, 2 Violini, Viola, 5 Tromboni, Fagotto, Basso continuo (1645/49)
Missa S. Ignatij: SSAATTBB, 2 Violini, 4 Viole, 2 Trombettæ, 2 Cornetti, 4 Tromboni, Viola da gamba, Violone, Organo (dated August, 1668)
Missa Augusta: 8 voci, 2 Violini, 2 Cornetti, 4 Tromboni (parts missing)
Missa à. 7. in honorem S. a Barbaræ: SSATB, 2 Cornettini, Organo (dated 1671)
Canzon pro tabula à 10: 2 Cornetto, 2 Violini, Viola, 3 Tromboni, Organo

Further reading 
Johann Joseph Fux
Heinrich Ignaz Franz von Biber
Johann Heinrich Schmelzer
Kroměříž
Colossal Baroque
Cornetto
Natural trumpet
Cornettino
Baroque
Mass

References
A Catalog of Music for the Cornett by Bruce Dickey and Michael Collver, Indiana University Press  © 1996 by Michael Collver & Bruce Dickey.
CD Motets of the 17th Century: Austria, Bohemia, Bavaria - Niederaltaicher Scholaren directed by Konrad Ruhland (from CD notes) Sony CD SK 53 117

1600s births
1659 deaths
Austrian male composers
Austrian composers
Austrian classical organists
Male classical organists
17th-century classical composers
17th-century male musicians